Robert Iain Colin "Bob" Billingham (December 10, 1957 – March 30, 2014) was an American competitive sailor and Olympic silver medalist. Billingham was born in London, England. At the 1988 Summer Olympics, Billingham finished in second place in the soling class along with his partners John Kostecki and William Baylis. Billingham graduated from Amherst College (1979).

References

External links
 
 

1957 births
2014 deaths
American male sailors (sport)
Australian Champions Soling
Medalists at the 1988 Summer Olympics
North American Champions Soling
Olympic silver medalists for the United States in sailing
Sailors at the 1988 Summer Olympics – Soling
Soling class world champions